The 2019–20 Ligue 1 season, also known as Ligue 1 Conforama for sponsorship reasons, was a French association football tournament within Ligue 1. It was the 82nd season since its establishment. The season began on 9 August 2019 and ended abruptly on 28 April 2020.

On 13 March 2020, the LFP suspended Ligue 1 and Ligue 2 indefinitely following the outbreak of COVID-19 in France. On 28 April 2020, it was announced that Ligue 1 and Ligue 2 campaigns would not resume, after the country banned all sporting events until September. On 30 April 2020, Paris Saint-Germain were awarded the championship following the cancellation of the 2019–20 season.

PSG topped the standings by 12 points with a game in hand at the time the league was halted. Marseille and Rennes were awarded the other two UEFA Champions League spots based on their rankings at the league's suspension. On 9 June 2020, France's highest administrative court ruled that relegation for Amiens and Toulouse was suspended for this season. This was overruled on 23 June and subsequently Amiens and Toulouse were relegated to the 2020–21 Ligue 2.

Teams

Changes
Metz and Brest were promoted from the 2018–19 Ligue 2, replacing the two relegated teams from the 2018–19 Ligue 1, Caen and Guingamp.

Stadium and locations

Number of teams by regions

Personnel and kits

Managerial changes

League table
The final standings were based on an average of points earned per matches played. In case of a tied average, head-to-head results were used to rank them if both matches between them were played.

Results

Season statistics

Top goalscorers

Clean sheets

Hat-tricks

References

External links

 

Ligue 1 seasons
1
France
France